The Boy is a 2016 supernatural horror film directed by William Brent Bell and written by Stacey Menear. The film stars Lauren Cohan and Rupert Evans. It is an international co-production between China and the United States. Filming began on March 10, 2015, in Victoria, British Columbia. STXfilms released The Boy in the United States on January 22. The film grossed $64 million worldwide on a $10 million budget. A sequel, Brahms: The Boy II, was released on February 21, 2020.

Plot
Greta Evans, an American from Montana, travels to the United Kingdom after being hired as a nanny by the elderly Heelshires. Upon her arrival, the couple introduce Greta to her charge: a lifesize porcelain doll named Brahms that they treat like their son. The Heelshires coach Greta on taking care of Brahms and their house while they are on holiday; leaving her a list of strict rules to follow, including reading to Brahms in a loud, clear voice and playing loud music for him.

Initially, Greta ignores the rules. She regularly calls her sister, who tells her that Greta’s abusive ex-boyfriend Cole has been trying to find out where she is. Malcolm, the local deliveryman, stops by often, and Greta learns that the real Brahms was killed in a fire 20 years ago on his eighth birthday. Malcolm asks-out Greta, and she accepts. While preparing for the date, her dress and jewelry vanish while she is in the shower; she is lured to the attic by strange noises and locked inside, and is mysteriously let out the next morning. In the attic, she finds photographs of young Brahms and in each of them he looks sullen and never smiles. She explains to Malcolm what happened, and they discuss the real Brahms, whom Malcolm says Mr. Heelshire described as "odd".

Strange events occur: a child's sobs are heard in the hallways, phone calls are cut off, and the doll seems to move on its own. After receiving a phone call in which a child's voice urges her to follow the rules, Greta locks herself in her room. She then finds a peanut butter and jelly sandwich outside her door, her favorite, and the child's voice promises he will be good. Believing that Brahms' spirit lives within the doll, Greta begins to take the rules seriously.

Remembering that the Heelshires said Brahms was shy, she realizes that the doll only moves when she isn't in the room with him; she demonstrates this to Malcolm, who becomes worried. He informs Greta that a girl Brahms was friends with was found in the forest with her skull crushed. Before the police could question Brahms, the Heelshires' house was burnt down with him in it. Malcolm warns her not to stay, but Greta, having previously suffered a miscarriage after being beaten by Cole, feels obligated to care for Brahms. Elsewhere, the Heelshires write a goodbye letter to Brahms before drowning themselves.

One evening, Cole arrives, intending to force Greta back home. For Greta's safety, Malcolm stays nearby. Greta asks the doll for help. Cole wakes up and sees a message written in blood telling him to leave. Believing it was done by either Greta or Malcolm, he angrily smashes the doll to pieces. The house begins to shake and they hear noises behind the walls. The mirror explodes; from a hole behind it emerges the real, now-adult Brahms wearing a porcelain mask identical to the doll's face; after surviving the fire, Brahms has been living in the walls of the house and is abnormal. Brahms kills Cole, then turns on Malcolm and Greta.

As they are pursued, Greta and Malcolm discover Brahms' room; a doll made from Greta's missing dress, hair, and jewelry sits in Brahms' bed, and Greta finds the goodbye letter from the Heelshires, revealing their plan of leaving Greta behind as a mate for Brahms. Brahms knocks out Malcolm, threatening to kill him if Greta leaves. Greta is able to escape the house but returns to save Malcolm. Arming herself with a screwdriver, she invokes the rules and forces Brahms to bed. He asks for a good night kiss; when he tries to kiss her, she stabs him. Brahms tries to choke her but she pushes the weapon in deeper and he collapses. Greta rescues Malcolm and they escape the house.

Later, someone is seen repairing the doll on the stairs.

Cast
 Lauren Cohan as Greta Evans 
 Rupert Evans as Malcolm
 Jim Norton as Mr. Heelshire
 Diana Hardcastle as Mrs. Heelshire
 Ben Robson as Cole
 Stephanie Lemelin as voice of Sandy
 Jett Klyne as young Brahms Heelshire
 James Russell as adult Brahms Heelshire
 Lily Pater as Emily Cribbs

Production

Development

On July 14, 2014, it was announced that The Devil Insides director William Brent Bell was set to direct a supernatural thriller, The Inhabitant, which Tom Rosenberg and Gary Lucchesi would produce through Lakeshore Entertainment, along with Roy Lee, Matt Berenson, Jim Wedaa, through Vertigo Entertainment. The script was written by Stacey Menear.

Casting
On January 23, 2015, Lauren Cohan signed on to star for the lead role in the film, which by then had been retitled The Boy. On March 11, 2015, more cast members were announced, including Jim Norton, Diana Hardcastle, Ben Robson, Rupert Evans and James Russell.

Filming
On March 10, 2015, principal photography on The Boy officially began in Victoria, British Columbia, Canada, at Craigdarroch Castle. Filming was completed a month later, on April 12, 2015.

Release
On February 25, 2015, STX Entertainment acquired the US rights to the film and set the film for a February 5, 2016, release, but in March 2015 the release of the film was moved up to January 22, 2016.

Reception

Box office
The Boy grossed $35.8million in the United States and Canada, and $32.4million in other territories, for a worldwide total of $68.2 million, against a production budget of $10million.

The film was released in the United States on January 22, 2016, alongside Dirty Grandpa and The 5th Wave, and was projected to gross $10–13million from 2,671 theaters in its opening weekend. The film made $3.9million on its first day and $10.8million in its opening weekend, finishing fifth at the box office.

Critical response
On Rotten Tomatoes, the film holds an approval rating of 30% based on 64 reviews and an average rating of 4.50/10. The site's consensus reads "The Boy could have gone in any number of scary or interesting directions, but instead settles for usual jump scares scattered throughout a pedestrian plot." Metacritic gives the film a weighted average score of 42 out of 100 based on 10 critics, indicating "mixed or average reviews". Audiences polled by CinemaScore gave the film an average grade of "B−" on an A+ to F scale.

Joe Leydon criticized the average story line in Variety and commented, "Despite game efforts by the cast, this tepid horror opus is never scary enough to overcome its silly premise." Chris Alexander of ShockTilYouDrop called it "one of the best contemporary wide-release horror movies I've seen in years". A review for The Wrap stated that the "scary-doll horror flick is creepy and clever".

In 2017, GQ Magazine called it "the most underrated horror movie of 2016".

Sequel 

By October 2018, it was announced that a sequel was in development. Katie Holmes was cast to play Liza, the mother of a young family who, unaware of the dark history, move into the Heelshire Mansion. The premise follows the story of the youngest son finding the porcelain doll, and befriending Brahms. William Brent Bell and Stacey Menear returned as director and screenwriter, respectively. Tom Rosenberg, Gary Lucchesi, Eric Reid, Matt Berenson, Jim Wedaa and Roy Lee served as producers. It was released on February 21, 2020.

See also
 List of horror films of 2016
 Bad Ronald, a 1974 film also featuring a troubled boy who murders a young girl and is then hidden by parents in the walls of his house.

References

External links
 
 
 
 
 

2016 films
2016 horror films
American horror films
2010s English-language films
Fictional dolls and dummies
Films set in England
Films shot in British Columbia
Huayi Brothers films
Lakeshore Entertainment films
STX Entertainment films
Films about dolls
Films directed by William Brent Bell
Films produced by Roy Lee
Films produced by Tom Rosenberg
Films produced by Gary Lucchesi
Films about nannies
Films scored by Bear McCreary
Films set in country houses
Vertigo Entertainment films
Horror films about toys
2010s American films